Ovabunda is a genus of soft corals in the family Xeniidae.

Species
The World Register of Marine Species lists the following species:
Ovabunda ainex  (Reinicke, 1997) 
Ovabunda andamanensis Janes, McFadden & Chanmethakul, 2014  
Ovabunda arabica (Reinicke, 1995)  
Ovabunda benayahui (Reinicke, 1995)  
Ovabunda biseriata (Verseveldt & Cohen, 1971)  
Ovabunda crenata (Reinicke, 1997)  
Ovabunda faraunenesis (Verseveldt & Cohen, 1971)  
Ovabunda gohari (Reinicke, 1997)  
Ovabunda hamsina (Reinicke, 1997)  
Ovabunda impulsatilla (Verseveldt & Cohen, 1971)  
Ovabunda macrospiculata (Gohar, 1940)  
Ovabunda obscuronata (Verseveldt & Cohen, 1971)  
Ovabunda verseveldti (Benayahu, 1990)

References

Xeniidae
Octocorallia genera